"Roller Coster" is a song by American recording artists Toni Braxton and Babyface. It was written by Babyface, Daryl Simmons, and Antonio Dixon for their collaborative studio album Love, Marriage & Divorce (2014), while production was helmed by former. The song was released on May 24, 2014 as the album's third and final single. "Roller Coaster" peaked at number 17 on the US Adult R&B Songs and was ranked 48th on the chart's year-end listing. Braxton and Babyface performed on their joint Toni Braxton & Babyface African Tour in 2015.

Commercial performance
"Roller Coaster" debuted on the US Adult R&B Songs at number seventeen on June 14, 2014. It spent a total of eighteen weeks on the chart alone.

Track listings
Digital download
"Roller Coaster" – 4:23

Credits and personnel 
Credits adapted from the liner notes of Love, Marriage & Divorce.

Toni Braxton – vocals, background vocals
Antonio Dixon – drum programming, percussion, programming, composer
Kenneth "Babyface" Edmonds – drum programming, composer, producer, vocals
Daryl Simmons – background vocals, composer, additional vocal production

Charts

Weekly charts

Year-end charts

References

Toni Braxton songs
Songs written by Babyface (musician)
Song recordings produced by Babyface (musician)
Babyface (musician) songs
2014 songs
Songs written by Daryl Simmons
Songs written by Antonio Dixon (songwriter)